Tania Mary Dalton (née Nicholson; 26 November 1971 – 1 March 2017) was a New Zealand international netball player. After retiring from playing professionally, she worked as a netball commentator on SKY Sports for international tests, the ANZ Championship and National Championships, alongside former internationals Anna Stanley, Natalie Avellino, Kathryn Harby-Williams and Bernice Mene. Dalton was also a part owner of the franchise food outlet chain, Pita Pit New Zealand Limited.

Career

Dalton was a member of the New Zealand national netball team, the Silver Ferns from 1996–2004 and 2006–07; she was also named in 2005 but was forced out through injury. She played domestic netball for the Northern Force from 1998 until 2000, and the championship-winning Southern Sting from 2002–2006. She was part of the  2003 Netball World Championships winning Silver Ferns squad. She made 12 caps for the Silver Ferns in total, playing in the positions of goal shooter (GS) and goal attack (GA). In 2007, she withdrew from the Silver Ferns to concentrate on family commitments.

In 2008, Dalton made a minor comeback to elite netball replacing injured Australian import Megan Dehn in the Southern Steel line. She did not take the court but was also offered a two-game contract by Northern Mystics who lost Paula Griffin to injury, which she declined.

During the 2011 ANZ Championship pre-season, Southern Steel shooter Daneka Wipiiti injured her ankle and was ruled out of action for up to a week. Dalton returned to the Steel as a temporary replacement player on 14 February that year.

Death

Dalton collapsed on 23 February 2017 while playing a regular game of social touch rugby in her home suburb of Takapuna, Auckland. She was running at the time and was not injured in the game. She was immediately hospitalised in a critical condition with a ruptured internal carotid artery aneurysm. On 28 February, her family agreed to the removal of her life support therapy. She died on 1 March.

References

1971 births
2017 deaths
New Zealand netball players
New Zealand television presenters
New Zealand international netball players
Southern Steel players
Deaths from intracranial aneurysm
Netball players from Auckland
People from Takapuna
New Zealand women television presenters
People educated at Carmel College, Auckland
New Zealand netball commentators
2003 World Netball Championships players
Northern Force players
Southern Sting players
Waikato Bay of Plenty Magic players
National Bank Cup players